Events from the year 1308 in Ireland.

Incumbent
Lord: Edward II

Events
 Adam de Wodington appointed Lord Chancellor of Ireland
 Richard de Beresford appointed Lord Chancellor of Ireland.

Births

Deaths
8 November – death of Johannes Duns Scotus.

References

 
1300s in Ireland
Ireland
Years of the 14th century in Ireland